Alazraki is a surname of Turkish origin, notably borne by the Alazraki family of Mexico. Members of the family include:

León Alazraki Barquí, Turkish-Mexican textile industrialist and Jewish leader
Benito Alazraki (1921–2007), Mexican film director and screenwriter, son of León
Carlos Alazraki (born 1947), Mexican advertising executive, son of Benito
Gary Alazraki (born 1983), Mexican film director, son of Carlos